Santa Maria del Soccorso is a church located within the archaeological site of Villa Jovis, on the island of Capri, Italy. It is situated on the summit of the Lo Capo (also known as, Santa Maria del Soccorso) hill at the eastern extremity of the island. The chapel-like church, was constructed ca. 1610. Its fittings include a bronze statue of the Madonna, a 1979 gift of the Caprese painter Guido Odierna (1913-1991). In the late 19th century, hermit lived at the church, keeping a visitor's book and selling wine.

References

Roman Catholic churches in Capri, Campania
Roman Catholic churches completed in 1610
1610 establishments in the Kingdom of Sicily
1610 establishments in Italy
17th-century Roman Catholic church buildings in Italy
Autore della statua è lo scultore trevigiano Alfiero Nena